SM Town Live 2023: SMCU Palace at Kwangya (stylized as SMTOWN LIVE 2023: SMCU PALACE @ KWANGYA) is an online live concert held on January 1, 2023, by SM Entertainment. Similar to the 2021 and 2022 editions, the concert was broadcast free of charge online through various streaming platforms and selected broadcasting network in selected countries.

Background
On November 30, 2022, SM Entertainment announced that it would be releasing an winter album titled 2022 Winter SM Town: SMCU Palace. In the same announcement, it was also announced that a free-to-watch live online concert will also be held on January 1, 2023. The lineup consisting of Kangta, BoA, TVXQ, Super Junior, Taeyeon and Hyoyeon of Girls' Generation, Onew, Key, and Minho of Shinee, Suho, Xiumin, Chen, Chanyeol, D.O., Kai, and Sehun of Exo, Red Velvet, NCT U, NCT 127, NCT Dream, WayV, Aespa, Got the Beat, DJ Hyo, Raiden, Ginjo, Mar Vista, Imlay, and NCT-Johnny was announced on December 28, 2022. On December 29, 2022, it was announced Got the Beat would be performing their new song titled "Stamp on It" from their upcoming EP of the same name prior to the actual release.

Performers

Broadcast

References

SM Town concert tours
2023 concert tours
Beyond Live